David Škoch defeated Brian Dunn in the final, 6–4, 6–3 to win the boys' singles tennis title at the 1992 Wimbledon Championships.

Seeds

  Grant Doyle (quarterfinals)
  Gabriel Silberstein (first round)
  Andrei Pavel (semifinals)
  Brian Dunn (final)
  Adriano Ferreira (second round)
  Andrew Richardson (second round)
  Miles Maclagan (semifinals)
  Song Hyeong-keun (third round)
  Noam Behr (first round)
  David Škoch (champion)
  Gustavo Díaz (first round)
  Nitin Kirtane (second round)
  Nathapol Ploysuk (first round)
  Andrés Zingman (first round)
  Filip Kaščák (second round)
  Herbert Wiltschnig (first round)

Draw

Finals

Top half

Section 1

Section 2

Bottom half

Section 3

Section 4

References

External links

Boys' Singles
Wimbledon Championship by year – Boys' singles